JSC AeroBratsk is a minor Russian charter airline headquartered in Bratsk and based at Bratsk Airport, which it also runs.

History 
AeroBratsk was established in 1967. It was formerly the Aeroflot Bratsk Division, and was renamed Bratsk Avia following the collapse of the Soviet Union. The airline is owned by Rosimushchestvo (51%) and its employees (49%). AeroBratsk was acquired by Centre Capital, which also owned now defunct Russian leisure airline VIM Airlines, at the end of 2004.

Destinations 
As of November 2017, AeroBratsk currently only offers charter operations. As of 2009, it still used to operate domestic scheduled destinations from its base at Bratsk Airport to Moscow, Irkutsk and Lensk.

Fleet 

As of November 2017, the Aerobratsk fleet includes the following aircraft:

References
Citations

Bibliography

External links 

 Official website  

Airlines of Russia
Airlines established in 1967
Former Aeroflot divisions
1967 establishments in the Soviet Union
1992 establishments in Russia
Companies based in Irkutsk Oblast